is a licensed professional wrestling video game by Yuke's, released in Japan for the Xbox 360 and PlayStation 2. The game combines the top stars of New Japan Pro-Wrestling, All Japan Pro Wrestling, Pro Wrestling Noah, and freelancers.

The Xbox 360 version of the game was temporarily recalled in Japan due to it not saving properly to the system's hard drive. A release event planned for the following two days after its release was cancelled.

A sequel, Wrestle Kingdom 2, was released in May 2007.

Gameplay
Wrestle Kingdom uses a modified engine seen in previous Yuke's games, the WWE Day of Reckoning series. While not as simulation-based as its Japanese contemporaries, it is also not as frantic and arcade-like as its American counterparts.

Wrestle Kingdom has the basic wrestling video game matches, including singles, tag teams, triple threats, fatal four ways, and battle royals. No specialty matches are featured.

The defining mode in Wrestle Kingdom is the Drama mode. In this mode, players must create a wrestler and train under one of the top stars from each promotion. As they go, they must train to improve their stats. This is the only way to unlock more moves.

Towards the end, the player will pick from a list of promotional titles or tournaments, such as the G1 Climax. Depending on which the player selects, they can unlock certain wrestlers and unlock their trainer's move set.

Roster
The game's roster features wrestlers from the top three Japanese promotions - New Japan Pro-Wrestling, All Japan Pro Wrestling and Pro Wrestling Noah - as well as freelancers and legends. Brock Lesnar and Giant Bernard are exclusive to the PlayStation 2 version of the game. Conversely, Kazuyuki Fujita is an exclusive to the Xbox 360 version.

Reception
Wrestle Kingdom received generally positive reviews. Alfred Alfonso, writing for American website IGN, enjoyed the PS2 version of the game, praising the Drama mode and graphics, but criticized the length of the loading times.

Release
The game was never released outside of Japan.

See also

Wrestle Kingdom 2

References

External links
Official Xbox 360 website 
Official PlayStation 2 website 

2005 video games
All Japan Pro Wrestling
Japan-exclusive video games
New Japan Pro-Wrestling
PlayStation 2 games
Professional wrestling games
Pro Wrestling Noah
Video games developed in Japan
Xbox 360 games
Yuke's games
Multiplayer and single-player video games